Augusto Severo de Albuquerque Maranhão (11 January 1864 – Paris, 12 May 1902) was a Brazilian politician, journalist, inventor and aeronaut.

Severo was born in Macaíba. On 12 May 1902 he died, together with his French mechanic, Georges Saché, when they were flying over Paris in an airship called Pax. A marble plaque at number 81 of the Avenue du Maine in Paris, commemorates the location of Augusto Severo accident. The Catastrophe of the Balloon "Le Pax" is a 1902 short silent film recreation of the wreck.

References

1864 births
1902 deaths
Airship designers
Aviation pioneers
Aviators killed in aviation accidents or incidents in France
Brazilian inventors
Brazilian journalists
Brazilian politicians
People from Rio Grande do Norte
Victims of aviation accidents or incidents in 1902